The 1990 edition of the FIBA World Championship for Women (Malay: Kejohanan Dunia FIBA 1990 untuk Wanita) was held in four cities in Malaysia (Kota, Kota Kinabalu, Kuching and Kuala Lumpur), from July 17 to 22, 1990. The USA won the tournament ahead of Yugoslavia and Cuba.

Venues
 Kuala Lumpur
 Kuching
 Kota Kinabalu
 Kota

Squads

Preliminary round

Group A

Group B

Group C

Group D

Quarterfinal round

Group A

Group B

Group C

Group D

Knockout stage

Championship Bracket

5–8th place Bracket

9–12th place Bracket

13–16th place Bracket

13–16th-place semifinals

9–12th-place semifinals

5–8th-place semifinals

Semi-finals

Match for 15th place

Match for 13th place

Match for 11th place

Match for 9th place

Match for 7th place

Match for 5th place

Bronze-medal game

Final

Final ranking

Awards

References
 Results
 lasgigantes
 1990 FIBA World Championship for Women

 
1990 in women's basketball
1990
1990 in Malaysian women's sport
International women's basketball competitions hosted by Malaysia
July 1990 sports events in Asia